Gravati is a family-owned company founded in Milan, Italy in 1909. It manufactures men's and women's dress shoes in Vigevano, Italy. Although Gravati uses a variety of shoe construction methods, including Bologna and Goodyear construction, the majority of their production uses the Blake construction method. The shoes are hand-crafted entirely within the factory by skilled artisans and technicians. Every pattern of every Gravati shoe is hand-cut. Unlike most modern shoe manufacturers, Gravati does not maintain stock—retailers must specify the patterns, lasts, leathers, soles, and construction methods that they want; only then will the factory make the shoes. Their production methods are typical of many upper-echelon shoemakers in that the uppers are cut (or clicked), lasted and finished by hand, however all sewing is done by machine.

Gravati's American retailers include Stanley Korshak, Davide Cenci and Wilkes Bashford.

See also

List of Italian companies

References

External links 
 

Shoe brands
Italian brands
Clothing companies established in 1909
Italian companies established in 1909
High fashion brands
Luxury brands
Vigevano
Shoe companies of Italy
Companies based in Lombardy